The Techniques of Democracy is a book written by Alfred Bingham. It was published in 1943 by New York City publishers Duell, Sloan and Pearce. In this book, Bingham argues against both dogmatic individualism and dogmatic socialism.

1942 non-fiction books
Duell, Sloan and Pearce books